Noble County is located in the north central part of Oklahoma. As of the 2010 census, the population was 11,561. Its county seat is Perry. It was part of the Cherokee Outlet in Indian Territory until Oklahoma Territory was created in 1890, and the present county land was designated as County P. After the U. S. government opened the area to non-Indian settlement in 1893, it was renamed Noble County for John Willock Noble, then the United States Secretary of the Interior.

History
During the 18th and 19th centuries, the area now occupied by Noble County was used as a hunting ground by the Osage Indians. In 1835, a treaty with the Cherokees made it part of the so-called Cherokee Outlet. During the time of Cherokee ownership, non-native cattlemen who belonged to the Cherokee Strip Live Stock Association leased grazing land from the tribe. Later, reservations were created in the northeastern part of the county for the Otoe and Ponca tribes. These reservations existed until 1904, when the lands were allotted and added to Noble County.

The Cherokee Outlet became part of Oklahoma Territory at the time of the Oklahoma Organic Act, and was divided into counties.  After the 1893 opening of the Cherokee Outlet for settlement by non-Indians, the land was divided into counties. One county, originally designated as County P, was renamed in honor of John W. Noble, interior secretary in 1893. The town of Perry was laid out in August 1893 as the county seat and land-office town

Oklahoma City bomber Timothy McVeigh was arrested in Noble County April 19, 1995 heading north bound on Interstate 35. McVeigh was stopped for not having a car tag on his car. He was minutes from being released when the Noble County Sheriff's Department was notified to hold McVeigh. McVeigh was tried and convicted for the bombing attack that killed 168 persons and injured many more. He was executed in 2001. McVeigh's arresting officer, Charlie Hanger, was elected Noble County Sheriff in 2004.

In 2010, the Keystone-Cushing Pipeline (Phase II) was constructed north to south through Noble County.

Geography
The Arkansas River forms part of the county's northeastern boundary. Two of its tributaries, Red Rock Creek in the north and by Black Bear Creek in the south, drain the county before emptying into the Arkansas River.

Major highways

  Interstate 35
  U.S. Highway 64
  U.S. Highway 77
  U.S. Highway 177
  U.S. Highway 412
  State Highway 15
  State Highway 86
  State Highway 108
  State Highway 156
  State Highway 164

Adjacent counties
 Kay County (north)
 Osage County (northeast)
 Pawnee County (east)
 Payne County (south)
 Logan County (southwest)
 Garfield County (west)

Demographics

As of the census of 2000, there were 11,411 people, 4,504 households, and 3,211 families residing in the county.  The population density was 6/km2 (16/mi2).  There were 5,082 housing units at an average density of 3/km2 (7/mi2).  The racial makeup of the county was 86.44% White, 1.58% Black or African American, 7.57% Native American, 0.33% Asian, 0.03% Pacific Islander, 0.65% from other races, and 3.40% from two or more races.  1.80% of the population were Hispanic or Latino of any race.

There were 4,504 households, out of which 32.00% had children under the age of 18 living with them, 59.00% were married couples living together, 8.40% had a female householder with no husband present, and 28.70% were non-families. 25.50% of all households were made up of individuals, and 11.20% had someone living alone who was 65 years of age or older.  The average household size was 2.47 and the average family size was 2.97.

In the county, the population was spread out, with 25.50% under the age of 18, 7.90% from 18 to 24, 27.50% from 25 to 44, 23.90% from 45 to 64, and 15.20% who were 65 years of age or older.  The median age was 38 years. For every 100 females there were 97.40 males.  For every 100 females age 18 and over, there were 96.00 males.

The median income for a household in the county was $33,968, and the median income for a family was $40,180. Males had a median income of $32,224 versus $21,235 for females. The per capita income for the county was $17,022.  About 9.60% of families and 12.80% of the population were below the poverty line, including 16.40% of those under age 18 and 11.00% of those age 65 or over.

Politics

Economy
The county economy has largely been based on agriculture and cattle. Wheat was the major crop, although alfalfa, oats, corn, and barley have also been important. The county lies in the Mid-Continent oil and gas region. Natural gas wells began producing in 1915–1919. Oil production began in the 1920s.

Ditch Witch, a Charles Machine Works company, is headquartered in Perry, the county seat.

Communities

City
 Perry (county seat)

Towns
 Billings
 Marland
 Morrison
 Red Rock

Census-designated place
 Lucien

Other unincorporated places
 Ceres
 Gansel
 Otoe
 Sumner

NRHP sites

The following sites in Noble County are listed on the National Register of Historic Places:

 First National Bank and Trust Company Building, Perry
 Morrison Baptist Church, Morrison
 Morrison Suspension Bridge, Morrison
 Noble County Courthouse, Perry
 Perry Armory, Perry
 Perry Courthouse Square Historic District, Perry
 Perry Lake Park, Perry
 Rein School, Ponca City vicinity
 Renfrow Building, Billings
 Renfrow House, Billings
 Sumner School, Morrison
 Wolleson-Nicewander Building, Perry

References

 
1893 establishments in Oklahoma Territory
Populated places established in 1893